The George Washington House, or Indian Queen Tavern, is located at Baltimore Avenue, at Upshur Street, in Bladensburg, Prince George's County, Maryland.  It was constructed in the 1760s. The -story structure is constructed of brick Flemish bond on ends.  The plan is rectangular, with a gabled roof, exterior end chimneys, gabled shingled dormers.  There are first and second-story center entrances, each with a transom.  There is a full-width one-story porch with balustraded deck and side entrances.  The structure includes a later two-story rear addition.  The structure is Georgian.

It represents the last remnant of a social and commercial complex established in the 1760s by Jacob Wirt, whose son William Wirt later became U.S. Attorney General and an 1832 presidential candidate.  The Indian Queen Tavern gained its reputation as the "George Washington House" through an assumption that "George Washington slept here." Research in primary sources has shown that the extant structure was never a tavern during Washington's lifetime, although it is possible that he stayed in the frame Indian Queen Tavern formerly located next to the present structure. The brick tavern began to be known as the "George Washington House" before 1878 when it was being used as a hotel.  The structure also housed Jacob Coxey's "army" of unemployed during an 1894 march on Washington, D.C. to demand relief.  It now serves as headquarters for the Anacostia Watershed Society.

It was listed on the National Register of Historic Places in 1974.

References

External links

, including photo in 1996, at Maryland Historical Trust website

Buildings and structures in Prince George's County, Maryland
Hotel buildings on the National Register of Historic Places in Maryland
Houses completed in 1732
Historic American Buildings Survey in Maryland
National Register of Historic Places in Prince George's County, Maryland
Bladensburg, Maryland